The eyalet of Aidin, also known as eyalet of Smyrna or Izmir was an eyalet of the Ottoman Empire.

After the Janissary corps was abolished in 1826, the administrative divisions of the Empire were changed, and the Eyalet of Anatolia was divided into 4. In 1841, the capital was moved to İzmir, only to be moved back to Aydın in 1843. Three years later, in 1846, the capital was moved to Izmir once again. With the adoption of the vilayet law in 1864, the eyalet was re-created as the Vilayet of Smyrna.

Administrative divisions
Sanjaks of the Eyalet in the mid-19th century:
 Sanjak of Saruhan (Manisa)
 Sanjak of Sığla (Izmir)
 Sanjak of Aydın (Aydın)
 Sanjak of Menteşe (Muğla)
 Sanjak of Denizli (Denizli)

References

Eyalets of the Ottoman Empire in Anatolia
History of Aydın Province
History of İzmir Province
History of Manisa Province
History of Muğla Province
1827 establishments in the Ottoman Empire
1864 disestablishments in the Ottoman Empire